Elaine Willett (born 8 January 1956) is a British gymnast. She competed at the 1972 Summer Olympics.

References

External links
 

1956 births
Living people
British female artistic gymnasts
Olympic gymnasts of Great Britain
Gymnasts at the 1972 Summer Olympics
People from Lewisham